Hilda M Light (1890–1967) was a pioneering sportswoman in the 1920s. She captained the England women's hockey team and served as President of the All England Women's Hockey Association (AEWHA).

Career 
Light played in the South Hampstead High School hockey team before being selected to play right half for Pinner and for Middlesex in 1909.

References

External links 

 AEWHA (Hockey) Collection at the University of Bath Library
 The Hockey Museum

1890 births
1967 deaths
British female field hockey players